Hay Amores Y Amores (There Loves And Loves) is the title of a studio album released by Spanish performer Rocío Dúrcal on 25 April 1995 by BMG Ariola, written and produced by Argentinean songwriter Roberto Livi. This album peaked at number-five on the Billboard Latin Pop Albums and number-twenty on Top Latin Albums. It was nominated for a Grammy Award in 1996 for Best Latin Pop Album.

Six singles were released from Hay Amores y Amores, all of which attained commercial success in the United States, the album's lead single "Vestida De Blanco" peaked at number 3 on the Billboard Hot Latin Tracks and number 5 on Latin Pop Airplay. Follow up singles "Cómo Han Pasado Los Años" and "Que De Mí" peaked within the top twenty of the chart.

Track listing

Awards and nominations 

 Premios ACE (The Association of Latin Entertainment Critics)

 Premio Aplauso (Miami)

 Grammy Award

Charts 
 Billboard Singles

 Billboard albums

Credits and personnel 
Musicians
 Rocío Dúrcal – Vocals
 Grant Geissman – Guitar
 Pavel Farkas – Concertmaster
 Teddy Mulet – Trumpet
 Rafael Ferro – Piano, Keyboards
 Lester Mendez – Keyboards
 Julio Hernandez – Bass
 Lee Levin – Drums
 Rafael Padilla – Percussion
 Jeanny Cruz, Rita Quintero, George Noriega, Raul Midon, Paul Hoyle, Rodolfo Castillo, Wendy Pedersen – Vocals

Production
 Directed and Performed by: Roberto Livi
 Arranger: Rafael Ferro
 Engineers: Mike Couzzi, Shawn Michael, JC Ulloa, Ted Stain and Rod Taylor
 Directed by Rafael Ferro
 Photographer: Adolfo Pérez Butron
 Recording Studios: Tropical Studies, Miami, Florida and Martinsound Studies, Los Angeles, CA; Tropical Studies. Miami, FL
 Label: BMG Music,  Ariola International (CD) and (LP), RCA Records (Cassette)
 Manufactured and Distributed by: BMG Music, Ariola International, RCA

References 

1995 albums
Rocío Dúrcal albums